The Shoe is a hamlet in the parish of North Wraxall, in the north-west of Wiltshire in England. It lies at the junction of the Fosse Way (the old Roman road from Exeter to Lincoln) and the A420 (running from Bristol to Oxford).

Facilities
There is a natural spring, which could suggest a historical settlement of some sort.  The Shoe Inn, marked on the 1:25,000 Ordnance Survey map, has now become a private house, although a board for public notices and a post box are still outside; there was a public telephone box but this has now been relocated to the grounds of the Community Hall.  There is a garage, a row of cottages ("Fosse Cottages") and a few larger houses.  Just off the Fosse Way, about 400 yards north of the A420 junction, lies the North Wraxall Village Hall, called the Community Hall, offering a playgroup and other amenities.

References

 G. M. Boumphrey, (1935) Along the Roman Roads. London: Allen & Unwin

Hamlets in Wiltshire